Alarm in den Bergen (Alarm in the Mountains) is a German thriller television series which was broadcast on ZDF in 1965. The 13-part series is set in the Bavarian Alps, in the border area around Garmisch.

Broadcasts 
The first broadcast took place in 1965 in the ZDF's evening program, every Monday at 6:55 PM. The show fit into the time slot between the Drehschiebe and the beginning of the 7:30 PM news. A rerun of the series was shown from the start of 1967 to the end of 1968 in the daytime programs of the ARD and ZDF. A final rerun was shown in 1971.

Plot 
The show focuses on the story of border patrol officer Hans Maussner, and his colleague Toni Kaiser. The plot rotates through stories involving smugglers, poachers, ski accidents, car crashes from mountain cliffs, and murder investigations.

Episode List

Trivia 
Because so many scenes were filmed in rocky areas or from great heights, bonus features in the DVD editions mention that filming was often very dangerous. The film crew received assistance from the Bavarian Mountain Rescue Service, the Bundeswehr, Bavarian Border Police, and the Austrian Gendarmerie.

See also 
List of German television series

External links

Works Cited 

1965 German television series debuts
1965 German television series endings
ZDF original programming
German-language television shows